We Sweat Blood is the second album by Canadian rock band Danko Jones.  It was re-released on April 19, 2005 in the United States with two additional tracks from the 2002 album Born a Lion, "Lovercall" and "Sound of Love".

Reception
In 2005, We Sweat Blood was ranked number 466 in Rock Hard magazine's book of The 500 Greatest Rock & Metal Albums of All Time.

Track listing

Liner notes
Produced by Matteo DeMatteo and Danko Jones
Recorded at Record High in Toronto, Canada
Engineered by Matteo DeMatteo
Mixed by Vic Florencia
Mixed at Polar Studios, Stockholm, Sweden
Mastered by Henrik Jonsson
Mastered at Polar Studios, Stockholm, Sweden
Artwork by Walse Custom Design
Photos by Jesper Lindgren
Backing Vocals on Strut by Dregen
Backing Vocals on "Wait a Minute" by Rosie Celano
Group vocals on "I love living in the City", "Strut" by Rosie Celano, Helga Rossi, Fionnuala Jamison, Melinn Chaban, Lionel Pedro, Dave Pedro and Paul Bozzi
Backing Vocals on "WE SWEAT BLOOD", the band with Matteo

References

2003 albums
Danko Jones albums